Mexico competed in the 2015 Pan American Games in Toronto, Ontario, Canada from July 10 to 26, 2015.

Racquetball Paola Longoria was the flagbearer of the team during the opening ceremony.

Competitors 
The following table lists Mexico's delegation per sport and gender.

Medalists

Aquatics

Diving 

Mexico has qualified a full team of eight athletes (four men and four women).

Swimming 

Mexico qualified 26 swimmers (12 men and 14 women)

Synchronized swimming 

Mexico has qualified a full team of nine athletes.

Archery 

Mexico has qualified the maximum team of three men and three women, for a total of six athletes.

Athletics 

Mexico's team consists on 39 athletes (22 men and 17 women).

Field events

Badminton 

Mexico has qualified a team of eight athletes (four men and four women).

Women

Basketball 

Mexico has qualified a men's team of 12 athletes.

Men's tournament 

Squad:

Group B

Seventh place match

Final rank: 8th

 Bowling 

Mexico has qualified a total of four athletes.

 Boxing 

|+Men

 Canoeing 

 Slalom 
Mexico has qualified 3 athletes in the following boats:

 Sprint 
Mexico has qualified 15 athletes in the sprint discipline (6 in men's kayak, 5 in women's kayak, 3 in men's canoe and 1 in women's canoe).

Qualification Legend: QF = Qualify to final; QS = Qualify to semifinal

 Cycling 

Mexico has qualified 9 male riders and 8 female riders for a total of 17 athletes.

Track cycling
Keirin

 Equestrian 

Mexico qualified a full team of twelve athletes (four per discipline).Jumping Fencing 

Mexico has qualified 15 fencers (9 men, 6 women).

 Field hockey 

Mexico has qualified both a men's and women's teams, for a total of 32 athletes (16 men and 16 women).

Men's tournamentPool BWomen's tournamentPool AQuarterfinalClassification semifinalFifth place match Football 

Mexico has qualified a men's and women's teams for a total of 36 athletes (18 male and 18 female).

 Men's tournament SquadHead Coach: Raúl Gutiérrez

Group B

 Women's tournament 

Group A

 Golf 

 Gymnastics 

Mexico has qualified a total of 20 gymnasts in the following categories:

 Artistic 
Mexico qualified 10 athletes.

Qualification Legend: Q = Qualified to apparatus final

Qualification Legend: Q = Qualified to apparatus final

 Rhythmic 
Mexico has qualified a full team of eight gymnasts (six in group and two in individual).

Qualification Legend: Q = Qualified to apparatus final

 Trampoline 
Mexico has qualified 2 athletes.

 Handball 

Mexico has qualified a women's team of 15 athletes.

 Women's tournament 

Group A

Semifinal

Bronze medal match

 Judo 

Mexico has qualified a team of twelve judokas (six men and six women).

 Karate 

Mexico has qualified a team of two men and four women for a total of 6 athletes.

Women

 Modern Pentathlon 

Mexico has qualified a team of two men and two women for a total of 4 athletes.

 Racquetball 

Mexico has qualified a team of three men and four women for a total of seven athletes.

 Roller sports 

Mexico has qualified a team of three men and three women for a total of six athletes.Figure skatingSpeed Skating Rowing 

Mexico has qualified 9 boats.

Qualification Legend: FA=Final A (medal); FB=Final B (non-medal); R=Repechage

 Rugby sevens 

Mexico has qualified a men's and women's teams for a total of 24 athletes (12 men and 12 women).

 Men's tournament Group A Women's tournament 

 Sailing 

Mexico qualified 6 boats.

Open

 Shooting 

Mexico has qualified 19 shooters.

 Softball 

Mexico has qualified a men's squad of 15 athletes.

 Men's tournament Group A Squash 

Mexico has qualified a full team of 6 athletes (3 men and 3 women).

 Table tennis 

Mexico has qualified a men's and women's team.

 Taekwondo 

Mexico has qualified a full team of eight athletes (four men and four women).

 Tennis 

Brazil has qualified a full team of six athletes (three men and three women).

 Triathlon 

Mexico qualified a full team of three men and three women, for a total of six athletes.

Women

 Volleyball 
 Beach 

Mexico has qualified a men's and women's pair for a total of four athletes.

 Indoors 

Mexico has qualified a men's team of 12 athletes.Men's tournamentGroup BSeventh place match

 Water polo 

Mexico has qualified a men's and women's teams. Each team will consist of 13 athletes, for a total of 26.

Men's tournament

RosterGroup BCrossoverFifth place matchWomen's tournament

RosterGroup ACrossoverFifth place matchFinal Rank:' 6th

Water skiing 

Mexico qualified a full team of 5 athletes. 4 in water skiing and 1 in wakeboarding.

Men

Women

Overall

Weightlifting 

Mexico has qualified a team of 9 athletes (5 men and 4 women).

Wrestling 

Mexico qualified a team of 10 athletes (6 men and 4 women)

Men

Freestyle

Greco-Roman

Women

Freestyle

See also 
Mexico at the 2016 Summer Olympics

References 

Nations at the 2015 Pan American Games
2015
2015 in Mexican sports